The Women's 100 metre Freestyle at the 10th Short Course World Swimming Championships took place 16–17 December 2010 in Dubai, United Arab Emirates. The heats and semifinals were 16 December; the final was 17 December.

89 swimmers participated in the event

Records
Prior to the competition, the existing world and championship records were as follows.

The following records were established during the competition:

Results

Heats

* Ottesen and Seppälä scratched semifinals; therefore Pang advanced on.

Semifinals

Semifinal 1

Semifinal 2

Final

References

External links
 2010 FINA World Swimming Championships (25 m): Women's 100 m freestyle entry list, from OmegaTiming.com; retrieved 2010-12-14.

Freestyle 0100 metre, women's
World Short Course Swimming Championships
2010 in women's swimming